Salesi Ma'afu, (born 26 March 1983 in Camperdown, Sydney, New South Wales) is an Australian professional rugby union footballer.

Early life
Ma'afu was educated at Granville and Ashfield Boys High Schools in Sydney and played rugby league as a youngster in the Balmain district before starting up with rugby, aged 11. Ma'afu first made his mark at representative level in the NSW Under-19 side in 2001 and 2002, later featuring in the Waratahs Academy through 2004 and 2005.

Club career
He signed with the ACT Brumbies in 2005 and made his Super Rugby debut in 2007. Ma'afu made the Australia A squad the same year, ending his year with a late-season appearance for the British Barbarians club during its 22-5 win over the new Rugby World Cup holders, South Africa. In the NSW club competition, after spending two years with Warringah, in 2009 Ma'afu returned to West Harbour, where he played alongside his brother Campese.

In 2011, Ma'afu signed to join the Perth-based Western Force, to commence 2012. He also is the club ambassador for local club, Joondalup Brothers RUFC, for whom himself and his children played.

Before the commencement of the 2013 Super Rugby season Ma'afu signed with the English Premiership side Northampton Saints ahead of the 2013/2014 season.
Ma'afu became a regular in the side, helping them to victory in both the Premiership and the European Challenge Cup. On 13 June 2015, Maafu would join top French club Toulon in the Top 14 on a two-year contract. After being released from his contract by the club, Ma’afu spent a season at Cardiff Rugby. Ma'afu returned to Aviva Premiership to sign for English club Gloucester Rugby

On 23 May 2017, Maafu returns to France as he signed for Pro D2 side RC Narbonne ahead of the 2017-18 season.

International career
Ma'afu's first test cap was in 2010 against Fiji, where he had the unusual challenge of marking his brother, who was also playing on debut. The pair became just the fourth set of brothers to oppose each other in Tests, and the first to achieve this feat when both were on debut. Subsequent tests in 2010 against England, Ireland, and South Africa completed a strong year for the prop.

In 2011 Ma'afu was selected in the Wallabies squad for the Rugby World Cup, in New Zealand.

References

External links 
 
Western Force Profile
itsrugby.co.uk profile

1983 births
Living people
Australian rugby union players
Australia international rugby union players
Australian people of I-Taukei Fijian descent
ACT Brumbies players
Western Force players
Northampton Saints players
RC Toulonnais players
Rugby union props
Rugby union players from Sydney
Australian expatriate rugby union players
Australian sportspeople of Tongan descent
Expatriate rugby union players in England
Australian expatriate sportspeople in England
Fijian people of Tongan descent
I-Taukei Fijian people
People educated at Ashfield Boys' High School
Australian expatriate sportspeople in Wales
Australian expatriate sportspeople in France